Heiruspecs is a live hip hop band based in the Midway neighborhood of Saint Paul, Minnesota. Their name is a deliberate misspelling of the word haruspex, which is a Roman term for a person trained to practice divination from the inspection of entrails.

The band's first releases Live from the Studio, and Antidisestablishmetabolism are out-of-print, though a compilation featuring songs from them was released as 10 Years Strong in December 2007. Their self-titled album "Heiruspecs," was released on December 13, 2008.  On April 22, 2014 the band released "Night Falls."

In contrast to many contemporary hip hop groups that use sampling and turntables, Heiruspecs emphasize a raw, live sound celebrating their roots, and local music scene, and are more known for their live performances than records. They do shows with Minnesota-local hip hop label Rhymesayers Entertainment, and the group's style has been compared to the live hip hop band The Roots. They have a very upbeat sound and are typically on tour for at least half of the year.

History
Heiruspecs formed in 1997 when the members were attending St. Paul Central High School. They met while taking a studio recording arts program there.  Sean (Twinkie Jiggles) would play bass while four or five drummers would rotate in and out of freestyle sessions, and Felix would rhyme throughout the whole process. Early Heiruspecs music contained trombone and saxophone, but these were absent on Small Steps and A Tiger Dancing. In 2004 Heiruspecs was named the best live artist in the Twin Cities by City Pages.

In commemoration of 10 years of St. Paul pride and good Hip Hop music, St. Paul Mayor Chris Coleman declared December 22 Heiruspecs Day in Saint Paul, Minnesota.
  
Heiruspecs took an unofficial hiatus after their tour van was totaled in 2005.

"Heiruspecs" was released on December 13, 2008.
 
In summer 2010, the band was in the studio working on a new album.

On December 23, 2022 the group released a new album, Pretty Random but What Happened to the Heiruspecs.

Members and Former Members

Current
Felix (Chris Wilbourn) - Vocals
Muad'dib (Jon Harrison) - Vocals, Beat Box
Twinkie Jiggles (Sean McPherson) - Bass
dVRG (DeVon Gray) - Keyboards
Peter Leggett - Drums
Josh Peterson - Guitar

Former
Martin Devaney - Saxophone
Bryan Alvarez - Trombone
Alex Oftelie - Drums
Al McIntosh - Trumpet
Steve McPherson - Guitar
Kevin Hunt - Drums
Conor Meehan - Drums
Tasha Baron - Keyboards
Alex Danovitch - Keys
Joshua Herbst - Drums
Brett Bullion - Drums
Noah Paster - Percussion, 808 pad
Tim Glenn - Drums

Discography

Studio albums
Live from the Studio
Antidisestablishmetabolism (2000)
Small Steps (2002)
A Tiger Dancing (2004)
Heiruspecs (2008)
Night Falls (2014)
Pretty Random but What Happened to the Heiruspecs (2022)

EPs 

 Theskyisfalling (2016)

Compilation albums
10 Years Strong (2007)
20/20 (2017)

References

Sources

American hip hop groups
Musical groups from Minnesota
Midwest hip hop groups
Alternative hip hop groups